Telescoped ammunition is an ammunition design in which the projectile is partially or completely enveloped by the propellant. Examples include ammunition for both hand weapons and artillery.  Caseless ammunition is often telescoped.  

Telescoped ammunition has advantages in comparison with traditional ammunition cartridges. They can have reduced overall length with similar ballistics to a traditional round of comparable mass. Also, they may avoid the risk of damage to the projectile during the loading process, and may simplify and increase the reliability of magazines and other feed mechanisms.

Cased telescoped ammunition for the LSAT light machine gun has reached technology readiness level 7. In August 2013, AAI Corporation was awarded a $US2.05 million contract to continue developing parts of the US LSAT program. Part of the contract is to further refine 5.56mm cased telescoped ammunition, and develop 7.62mm cased telescoped cartridges.

Beginning in late 2020, a polymer telescopic case based rifle designed by Textron, a US based defense contractor, was under consideration in the Next Generation Squad Weapon trials run by the United States Army.

References

External links
 Ammunition Design & Development - Veritay Technology
 United States Patent 4691638 - Cased telescoped ammunition
 CTA International 40mm photo
 CTAS Maturity Briefing - April 2009

Ammunition